Neville Ward Jackson (25 April 1875 — 23 March 1919) was an Anglo-Argentine first-class cricketer.

Jackson was born in British India to Colonel F. H. Jackson of the British Indian Army. He was educated in England at Haileybury. He later moved to Argentina, where he played first-class cricket for Argentina on three occasions in February 1912 against the touring Marylebone Cricket Club. He scored 152 runs in these matches, at an average of 25.33 and with a highest score of 49. Jackson died at Viamonte in Buenos Aires in March 1919.

References

External links

1875 births
1919 deaths
Argentine people of English descent
People educated at Haileybury and Imperial Service College
Argentine cricketers
British people in colonial India
British emigrants to Argentina